Air Commodore Whitney Willard Straight,  (6 November 1912 – 5 April 1979) was a Grand Prix motor racing driver, aviator, businessman, and a member of the prominent Whitney family of the United States.

Early life
Born in New York City, Whitney Straight was the son of Major Willard Dickerman Straight (1880–1918) and heiress Dorothy Payne Whitney (1887–1968). He was almost six years old when his father died in France of influenza during the great epidemic while serving with the United States Army during the First World War. Following his mother's remarriage to British agronomist Leonard K. Elmhirst (1893–1974) in 1925, the family moved to England. They lived at Dartington Hall where he attended the progressive school founded by his parents. His education was completed at Trinity College, Cambridge.

Career

Motor racing
While still an undergraduate at Cambridge, he became a well known Grand Prix motor racing driver and competed at events in the UK and Europe. He competed in more Grands Prix than any American until after the Second World War. Straight started competing in 1931 with a Brooklands Riley competing at Shelsley Walsh, Southport and Brooklands circuit.

In 1933, driving a black and silver Maserati, he won the Mountain Championship at Brooklands, the Mont Ventoux Hill Climb (3 September) and the Brighton Speed Trials (16 September). He also won the 1100 c.c. class in the Coppa Acerbo, held at Pescara, Italy, driving an MG Magnette. In 1934 he formed his own motor racing team, personally driving to victory in the South African Grand Prix, held on the 16-mile Buffalo circuit in East London. His brother Michael finished third in the same race. He also gave public demonstrations at Brooklands Racing Circuit achieving a speed of 138.7 mph, a record for 5-litre class cars.

Flying
Flying was also another of his passion. At age 16, though still too young for a pilot's licence, he had already accumulated over 60 hours solo flight. In his early 20s, as head of the Straight Corporation Limited, he operated airlines and airfields throughout Britain and ran flying clubs. He commissioned an advanced light aircraft, the Hendy Heck, and in 1936 he helped develop the Miles Whitney Straight aircraft, the same year he became a naturalised British citizen. On 18 October 1938, the Straight Corporation purchased control of Norman Edgar (Western Airways) Ltd. and renamed it Western Airways Ltd. His commercial airline business in the later 1930s was reputed to be carrying more passengers than Imperial Airways, on short routes within the UK, flying de Havilland Dragon Rapides.

Second World War
During the Second World War, Whitney Straight served as a Royal Air Force pilot. He was sent to Norway in April 1940 to find frozen lakes suitable for use as airfields. Lake Lesjaskog was utilised by No. 263 Squadron RAF during the Norwegian Campaign as a result. 
Straight was seriously wounded during a German bombing raid in Norway.

For his service in Norway, he was awarded the Norwegian War Cross with sword in 1942.

After convalescing, he next served with No. 601 Squadron RAF in the Battle of Britain. From September 1940 until April 1941, he was credited with two aircraft destroyed. He then became commanding officer of No. 242 Squadron RAF, bringing his total to 3 and 1 shared ( with 2 'probables') by late July 1941. Early in 1941 he was awarded a Military Cross for his work in Norway.

He was shot down by flak over France on 31 July 1941 and initially evaded capture. Through the French Underground, he made his way to unoccupied Vichy France where he was captured and put in a prisoner-of-war camp. However he escaped on 22 June 1942 and with the aid of the French Resistance reached safety in Gibraltar.

In September 1942, now as an air commodore, he was sent to the Middle East joining HQ, No. 216 Group RAF, as Air Officer Commanding.

After the war
At war's end, he returned to the UK becoming AOC, No. 46 Group in June 1945. He was released from the RAF in late 1945, and he became chairman of the Royal Aero Club. With the establishment of the British European Airways corporation in 1946, Straight was its deputy chairman. In July 1947, he became managing director and chief executive officer of British Overseas Airways Corporation. In 1949, Straight was appointed deputy chairman of the board. In the United States his cousin, Cornelius Vanderbilt Whitney (1899–1992), was the President of Aviation Corporation of America, which became Pan American Airways.

Around this time he was also on the board of Rolls-Royce and he discovered that in 1947 Rolls-Royce had sold 55 jet engines to the Soviet Union, the sale being approved by the post-war Labour government of Clement Attlee.  The Russians had copied the technology to produce their own version of the jet engine and were powering the MiG fighters using Rolls-Royce technology. He decided to sue the Russian government for copyright infringement. The figure claimed was £207 million which he never received.

In 1967, he donated the Whitney Straight Award to the Royal Aeronautical Society to recognise the achievement and status of women in aviation. The award consisted of a cheque and a sculpture by Barbara Hepworth. It was won by Anne Burns in 1967 and Peggy Hodges in 1970.

Personal life
On 17 July 1935 he married Lady Daphne Margarita Finch-Hatton (1913–2003), the daughter of Guy Finch-Hatton, the 14th Earl of Winchilsea (1885–1939) and Margaretta Armstrong Drexel, the Countess Winchilsea (1885–1952). Lady Daphne's paternal uncle was Denys Finch Hatton (1887–1931), a famous pilot who was involved with Beryl Markham (1902–1986), another British pilot. Lady Daphne was half-American as her mother, Margaretta, was the daughter of Anthony Joseph Drexel, Jr. (1864–1934) and the granddaughter of Anthony Joseph Drexel (1826–1893), all from Philadelphia, Pennsylvania.  Lady Daphne's maternal uncles included, Anthony J. Drexel II, who married Marjorie Gould, daughter of George Jay Gould, and John Armstrong Drexel (1891–1958), who was also an aviation pioneer. Together, Whitney and Lady Daphne had two daughters:
Camilla Caroline Straight, who on 22 June 1960, married Michael Ian Vansittart Bowater (b. 1934) (the son of Lt. Col. Sir Ian Bowater (1904–1982) and The Hon. Ursula Margaret Dawson (1907–1999))
Arabella Charlotte Bowater (1961–2005),
Katherine Elizabeth Bowater (b. 1963),
Caroline Mary Bowater (b. 1965)
Sophia Melissa Bowater (b. 1970)
Amanda Straight

Relationship with Diana Barnato Walker
While Straight was married to Lady Daphne, he had an affair with noted aviator Diana Barnato Walker, the first British woman to break the sound barrier. Diana was the daughter of Woolf Barnato (1895–1948), another famous racing driver, and the widow of Wing Commander Derek Ronald Walker, who was killed on 14 November 1945 in bad weather while flying. Together, Whitney and Diana had a son: Barney Barnato Walker (born 1947).

Death
Straight died in Fulham in 1979 at the age of 66. Lady Daphne died at her home in London on 3 June 2003, and Walker died on 28 April 2008, aged 90.

References
Notes

Sources

Air of Authority – A History of RAF Organisation – Air Cdre Straight
Rolls-Royce – Sunday Times 10 May 1987
Obituary – The Times 10 April 1979
 Obituary of Diana Barnato Walker – by Philip Jarrett – The Independent, 9 May 2008

1912 births
1979 deaths
Racing drivers from New York City
English racing drivers
Grand Prix drivers
Brooklands people
Naturalised citizens of the United Kingdom
Brighton Speed Trials people
Royal Air Force pilots of World War II
Royal Air Force group captains
Commanders of the Order of the British Empire
Recipients of the Distinguished Flying Cross (United Kingdom)
Recipients of the Military Cross
Recipients of the War Cross with Sword (Norway)
Officers of the Legion of Merit
Fellows of the Royal Geographical Society
Whitney family
American people of English descent
Alumni of Trinity College, Cambridge
The Few